Reverse-Flash is a name used by several supervillains appearing in American comic books published by DC Comics. Each iteration of the character serves as a foil and an enemy of the Flash.

Characters

Edward Clariss 

Edward Clariss (also known as the Rival and the Rival Flash) first appeared in Flash Comics #104 (February 1949), and was created by John Broome and Joe Kubert.

Publication history
Edward Clariss first appeared in Jay Garrick's final appearance in Flash Comics #104 (February 1949), and was created by John Broome and Joe Kubert as an evil counterpart of Jay Garrick during the Golden Age of Comic Books. He would be revived by Geoff Johns and David Goyer in a story called "Injustice Be Done" from the Justice Society of America comic books through the Modern Age of Comic Books.

Fictional character biography
Although not called the Reverse-Flash, Dr. Edward Clariss was a professor at the university attended by the Golden Age Flash, and had recreated the formula which was behind Jay Garrick's speed. He hears Joan Williams (Garrick's girlfriend) talking about how the Flash's own speed was given to another student, which helped him develop the formula. Bitter at the scientific community's rejection of his claims, Clariss becomes a criminal. A darker version of the Flash with a mask over his head, he gives the formula to other criminals. The Rival's version of the formula is temporary, and he is captured and jailed (later stories have indicated a possible link between the Clariss formula and the Velocity 9 created by Vandal Savage, but thus far no such link has been conclusively proven).

JSA #16 (November 2000) contains a flashback to a battle between the Rival and the Flash several months after the former's first appearance. Now that he has inexplicably regained super-speed, Clariss reaches light speed during the fight and vanishes into the Speed Force. After the Justice Society of America's reformation 50 years later, Johnny Sorrow retrieves Clariss from the Speed Force and invites him to join the Injustice Society. Driven insane in the Speed Force, the Rival races across the country on a killing spree. The Flash realizes that the Rival's path across the country spells out Clariss's name and the final murder victim will be Joan; Jay absorbs the Rival's speed before he can kill Joan.

The Rival returns in Impulse #88 (September 2002), posing as Joan's doctor. Now pure speed energy, he possesses fellow Golden Age speedster Max Mercury. After battling Jay and Impulse, Max time-travels to an unknown destination. In The Flash: Rebirth #4, Max escapes from the Speed Force and is rejuvenated by Wally West's energy; this allows him to return to Earth in a new body. Another Golden Age Reverse-Flash is a robot whose only appearance was in one panel of The Flash #134 (February 1998), where he is defeated by Garrick.

Eobard Thawne

Professor Eobard Thawne first appeared in The Flash #139 (September 1963). The archenemy of Barry Allen, he is the first to take on the name Professor Zoom, and oftentimes the Reverse-Flash.

Hunter Zolomon

Hunter Zolomon (also known as Zoom) first appeared in The Flash: Secret Files & Origins #3 (November 2001). The archenemy of Wally West, he is the second supervillain to be called the Reverse-Flash. Unlike all other Reverse-Flashes, he did not gain his superspeed from the Speed Force but due to an accident with the Cosmic Treadmill. Zolomon was essentially "derailed" from the time line, allowing him to control the rate at which he moves in time, which can make him faster than any speedster.

Thaddeus Thawne

Thaddeus Thawne (a.k.a. Inertia and later Kid Zoom) first appeared in Impulse #51 (August 1999), and was created by Todd DeZago and Mike Wieringo. Another character not called the Reverse-Flash, he is a clone of Bart Allen. Inertia first fought Impulse. When Bart aged five years after Infinite Crisis and became the Flash, Inertia fought his genetic template again. Inertia was responsible for Allen's death; Wally West returned, taking revenge by paralyzing Inertia and imprisoning him in the Flash Museum. In Final Crisis: Rogues' Revenge, he is used by Libra and Zoom to try to get the Rogues to join the Secret Society. Inertia steals Zoom's powers, calls himself Kid Zoom, and is killed by the Rogues, who blamed him for making them kill Bart.

When asked who created Inertia, Ethan van Sciver wrote that he could only accept five percent of the credit; the remaining credit belonged to Mike Wieringo (20 percent), Grant Morrison (25 percent) and Todd DeZago (50 percent). According to van Sciver, Inertia's appearance is an inverted depiction of Impulse.

Inertia initially appeared in Impulse #50: "First Fool's" (July 1999), followed by #51: "It's All Relative" (August 1999). His greatest character development was in #53: "Threats" (October 1999). Inertia was not featured again until Impulse #62 and #66: "Mercury Falling" (July, November 2000), and again for another five years.

He then began making regular appearances, primarily due to Bart being the Flash. Inertia appeared in The Flash: The Fastest Man Alive #5: "Lightning in a Bottle, Part 5" (December 2006). In addition to his Flash appearances, he appeared in Teen Titans (vol. 3) as part of Titans East, an enemy team, beginning in Teen Titans (vol. 3) #43 (January 2007). The storyline concluded with (vol. 3) #46 (April 2007). Gathering the Rogues, he attempted to drain Bart's powers for himself; the plan backfired when Wally returned and Inertia's equipment drained the Speed Force, making the Rogues accidentally beat Bart to death. As Inertia tried to escape, he was captured by Wally who steals his speed, leaving him immobile.

Inertia is primarily a speedster, remaining disconnected from the Speed Force after Infinite Crisis and injecting himself with Velocity 9. Although Velocity 9 has been unstable, Deathstroke's new variety seems to have no negative side effects. Inertia briefly shares his powers before his death with Zoom, who lends him his speed to pressure him into becoming a new Kid Flash. As the maddened Kid Zoom, he masters human time streams and reverts Zoom to the powerless Hunter Zolomon before he is killed by the Rogues. 

Inertia was later resurrected due to Doctor Manhattan's modifications on the timeline, but is currently trapped in the Speed Force. Inertia tries to stop Barry Allen, Max Mercury, and Jesse Quick from escaping the Speed Force, revealing that Eobard Thawne promised to release him and let him take over Bart Allen's body once the former succeeded in his plans. After Barry tries to appeal and talk sense into him, Inertia stops his attacks and runs off.

Daniel West

Daniel "Danny" West first appeared in The Flash #0 (November 2012). The younger brother of Iris West, the biological father of Wallace West and the uncle of Wally West.

Other versions

Tangent Comics

In DC's Tangent Comics, the Reverse-Flash is an evil, holographic duplicate of her Earth's Flash, Lia Nelson, who was created by a sinister government agency. She was charged with negative ionic energy to disperse the Flash's photon-based form. However, the Flash's light-wave powers outmatched the Reverse-Flash's and the latter was destroyed. This Reverse-Flash appeared in only one issue: Tangent Comics: The Flash #1 (December 1997).

Impulse
A 31st Century version of Thaddeus Thawne became President in the pages of Impulse.

In other media

Television
 Eobard Thawne / Professor Zoom appears in the Batman: The Brave and the Bold episode "Requiem for a Scarlet Speedster!", voiced by John Wesley Shipp.
 Three variations of individuals who have used the Reverse-Flash moniker in the comics appear in the Arrowverse series, The Flash. 
 Eobard Thawne / Reverse-Flash (portrayed by Tom Cavanagh and Matt Letscher) first appears in season one and continues to battle the Flash and his allies throughout the series. Additionally, Thawne appears in the spin-off series Legends of Tomorrow as the leader of the Legion of Doom as well as the crossovers "Crisis on Earth-X" and "Elseworlds".
 Hunter Zolomon / Zoom (portrayed by Teddy Sears and voiced by Tony Todd) primarily appears in season two. This version hails from Earth-2 and is ultimately transformed into the Black Flash by the Time Wraiths for corrupting the timeline.
 Edward Clariss / The Rival (portrayed by Todd Lasance) appears in season three. This version is a speedster who was originally a product of the "Flashpoint" timeline and arch-enemy of Wally West / Kid Flash. After the Flash undid the "Flashpoint" timeline, Clariss was made human again until Doctor Alchemy uses the philosopher's stone to turn him back into the Rival so he can seek revenge against the Flash. Clariss is ultimately defeated by the Flash, incarcerated in Iron Heights Penitentiary, and killed by Savitar.
 The Eobard Thawne incarnation of the Reverse-Flash makes a non-speaking cameo appearance in the Harley Quinn episode "L.O.D.R.S.V.P." as a member of the Legion of Doom.

Film
 Eobard Thawne / Professor Zoom appears in the DC Animated Movie Universe (DCAMU) films Justice League: The Flashpoint Paradox and Suicide Squad: Hell to Pay, voiced by C. Thomas Howell in both. 
 The Eobard Thawne incarnation of the Reverse-Flash appears in Lego DC Comics Super Heroes: The Flash, voiced by Dwight Schultz.

Video games
 Hunter Zolomon / Zoom appears as a boss in Justice League Heroes: The Flash. 
 Eobard Thawne / Professor Zoom appears as a mini-boss in DC Universe Online and the "Lightning Strikes" DLC.
 The Eobard Thawne incarnation of the Reverse-Flash appears a playable character in Lego Batman 3: Beyond Gotham
 The Eobard Thawne incarnation of the Reverse-Flash appears as a DLC skin in Injustice 2, voiced by Liam O'Brien.
 The Eobard Thawne incarnation of the Reverse-Flash appears as a playable character in Lego DC Super-Villains, voiced again by C. Thomas Howell. 
 Additionally, the Arrowverse version of Hunter Zolomon / Zoom appears in the DC TV Super-Villains DLC pack.

See also
 Blur, a White Martian/human hybrid who appeared in the Son of Vulcan miniseries
 Johnny Quick, the Flash's evil counterpart from Earth-3, where the Justice League of America is replaced with the Crime Syndicate of America
 List of Flash enemies

References

Villains in animated television series
Characters created by Mike Wieringo
Comics characters introduced in 1949
Comics characters introduced in 1999
DC Comics characters who can move at superhuman speeds
Fictional characters with spirit possession or body swapping abilities
DC Comics metahumans
DC Comics robots
DC Comics supervillains
DC Comics male supervillains
Clone characters in comics
Fictional murderers
Flash (comics) characters